Delta County Memorial Hospital is a regional hospital in Delta, Colorado, in Delta County. The hospital has 49 beds.

The hospital is part of the Delta County Memorial Hospital District, a special district. The current hospital organization was established in 1975, succeeding several previous hospitals and hospital organizations that existed in Delta as far back as 1913. The current main hospital building opened in 2008.

The hospital is a Level IV trauma center.  It operates walk-in clinics in Paonia and Hotchkiss, in addition to the seven specialty clinics based in Delta.

References

External links
Hospital website

Hospitals in Colorado
Buildings and structures in Delta County, Colorado
Hospitals established in 1975
1975 establishments in Colorado